Neodymium(III) carbonate is an inorganic compound, a salt, where neodymium is in the +3 oxidation state and the carbonate ion is in the -2 oxidation state. It has a chemical formula of Nd2(CO3)3. The anhydrous form is purple-red, while the octahydrate is a pink solid. Both of these salts are insoluble in water.

Preparation
Neodymium(III) carbonate can be created by the reaction between neodymium(III) hydroxide and carbon dioxide:

2Nd(OH)3 + 3CO2 → Nd2(CO3)3 + 3H2O

Neodymium(III) carbonate can also be created by passing carbon dioxide under pressure through a solution of neodymium(III) chloride containing aniline:

2NdCl3 + 3CO2 + 6C6H2NH2 + H2O → Nd2(CO3)3 + 6C_6H_5NH_2·HCl

It can also be obtained from the hydrolysis of neodymium(III) chloroacetate:

2Nd(C2Cl3O2)3 + 3H2O → Nd2(CO3)3 + 6CHCl3 + 3CO2

Another way to obtain neodymium(III) carbonate is by reacting neodymium(III) chloride with ammonium bicarbonate in water.

Properties

Chemical properties
Neodymium(III) carbonate dissolves in acids and releases carbon dioxide:
Nd2(CO3)3 + 6H+ → 2Nd3+ + 3H2O + 3CO2↑

Neodymium(III) carbonate can react with an acid to produce many neodymium salts：
H+ + Nd2(CO3)3 → Nd + H2O + CO2
For example, to create neodymium acetate with neodymium(III) carbonate:
6CH3COOH + 2Nd2(CO3)3 → 2Nd(CH3COO)3 + 3H2O + 3CO2

Neodymium(III) carbonate can form complexes with ammonium carbonate, sodium carbonate and potassium carbonate and many other salts, which explains their greater solubility in aqueous solutions than in distilled water. It can easily be converted into other neodymium compounds, such as neodymium(III) oxide when heated. It can also form compounds with hydrazine, such as Nd2(CO3)3·12N2H4·4H2O which is a transparaent crystal that is slightly soluble in water but insoluble in benzene, d20°C = 1.96 g/cm3.

Physical properties
Neodymium(III) carbonate forms crystals and has a crystalline hydrate composition of Nd2(CO3)3·n H2O, where n = 2.5 and 8. It doesn't dissolve in water.

Applications
Neodymium carbonate can be used for lasers, glass coloring and tinting, and dielectrics.

See also
 Neodymium
 Carbonate
 Lanthanide

References

Neodymium compounds
Carbonates